= Animal Saints and Sinners =

British Television series

Animal Saints and Sinners is a series of British television documentaries produced for BBC One by Avalon. It follows the work of animal welfare officers.
